Kalanjukittiya Thankam (The Stolen Gold) is a 1964 Indian Malayalam-language film, directed by S. R. Puttanna. The film stars Sathyan, Ambika, Adoor Bhasi and Thikkurissy Sukumaran Nair. The film had musical score by G. Devarajan. The movie is a remake of 1962 Kannada movie Gaali Gopura.

Cast
 
Sathyan as Sugathan 
Ambika as Girija 
Adoor Bhasi as KP Nair 
Thikkurissy Sukumaran Nair as Bhaskara Pillai 
P. J. Antony as Kuttan Nair 
Vasanthi as Hema 
Adoor Pankajam as Pankajam 
Aranmula Ponnamma as Sarada 
Bahadoor as K Ramachandran Maithanam 
T. K. Balachandran as Madhu 
Sukumari as Amminikkutty Amma 
T. S. Muthaiah as Unnithan 
Muttathara Soman
 Shylashri

Soundtrack
The music was composed by G. Devarajan and the lyrics were written by Vayalar Ramavarma.

References

External links

1960s Malayalam-language films
Films directed by Puttanna Kanagal
Malayalam remakes of Kannada films